Interstate 275 (I-275) is an Interstate Highway in Tennessee that serves Knoxville by connecting the downtown with I-75/I-640/US Route 25W (US 25W).  Measuring  in length, it runs from a northern terminus at the junction with I-75/I-640/US 25W to a southern terminus at I-40.

Route description

I-275 begins at a complicated interchange with I-40 in Downtown Knoxville. US 441 southbound (Henley Street), State Route 62 (SR 62, Western Avenue), and 11th Street are also directly accessible from I-275 southbound at this interchange, and northbound I-275 is directly accessible from US 441 northbound and SR 62 here. The route then curves sharply to the northwest and then sharply to the northeast about  later and crosses a railroad before reaching an interchange with Heiskell Avenue about  later. Passing through Sharp's Gap, a low point in Sharp's Ridge, I-275 reaches its northern terminus with I-75, I-640, and US 25W about  later. At this interchange, the route crosses I-640, and continues north as I-75.

History
The freeway that is now I-275 was first planned in the 1940s as part of a series of freeways for the city of Knoxville and was known initially as the North–South Expressway. The route was integrated into the Interstate System as part of I-75, and the southern terminus was the end of a concurrency with I-40 and I-75. The route was renumbered I-275 in December 1980, when I-75 was rerouted onto the new I-640 to divert traffic from the downtown area.

Work on most of the route began in March 1958, and the first section, located between I-40 and Baxter Avenue, opened on October 28, 1960, after several delays. The final section, located between Oldham Avenue and Heiskell Avenue, opened on January 24, 1962. A dedication ceremony for this section took place on February 9, 1962.

Between December 1, 2006, and January 26, 2008, the existing cloverleaf exits (1A–B, 1C–D, 2A–B) were replaced with traditional diamond interchanges to add a continuous third lane in each direction. This was done to handle increased traffic flow for the shutdown of I-40 in Downtown Knoxville that took place on May 1, 2008. I-275 was the designated detour route for I-75 northbound traffic during the I-40 shutdown to avoid traffic congestion at the I-75/I-640/I-275/US 25W junction as the ramp for I-75 northbound from I-640 eastbound is only one lane.

Exit list

References

External links

 Interstate 275 (Tennessee) at AARoads.com

75-2 Tennessee
75-2
2 Tennessee
Transportation in Knoxville, Tennessee
Transportation in Knox County, Tennessee